Rosenstrasse (or Rosenstraße) is a street in Berlin.

It may more specifically refer to:

Rosenstrasse protests, street protests, Berlin, 1943
Rosenstrasse (film), 2003 film by Margarethe von Trotta